Something to Feel is the debut studio album by New Zealand soul musician Teeks. Released in three parts, first as the extended plays I and II in 2020, the album was released in full in March 2021. The album was a commercial success, debuting at number one on the Official New Zealand Music Chart. In November 2021, the album was re-released, featuring the single "Oil & Water".

Production

The album's was written as an encouragement for people to express their emotions, especially men who had been taught by society to repress feelings. Teeks believed it was important to break up the album into smaller pieces, to ensure each song on the record had exposure. The first third, released as the extended play I, was thought of by Teeks as the invitation to the project, inviting people into the story of the album. Part two, released as the EP II, was thought of by Teeks as listeners "surrendering to that process of vulnerability", and listeners allowing listeners to grow and mature. The final third, which Teeks referred to as "The Reveal, was an amalgamation of everything together in the project.

"Without You" written about Teeks " truly long for someone" for the first time. The song "Oil & Water" was written in 2017 as a part of APRA Songhubs, in collaboration with Dave Baxter from Avalanche City, Emily Warren and Josh Fountain, and was written expressing Teeks' processing what was happening in his life, and finding solace in the ocean.

Release and promotion

The first single from the album, "Without You", was released in early August 2020. This was followed later in the month by the release of an extended play, I, which featured "Without You" along with three songs from Something to Feel: "Just for Tonight", "Waves" and "These Hands". This was followed by "Remember Me" in October, which featured a music video directed by Teeks himself, and in November Teeks released II, a second EP featuring "Remember Me" and three more album tracks, "Into You", "If You Were Mine" and "Here Before".

Teeks toured New Zealand in December 2020, with the Invitation Tour. On 5 March, Teeks released "First Time", three weeks before the release of the album, and toured New Zealand in June. Teeks released the single "Oil & Water" on 5 November 2021. "Oil & Water" was bundled with a re-issued version of Something to Feel, released on digital and streaming platforms.

Critical reception

Something to Feel was nominated for the Album of the Year award at the 2021 Aotearoa Music Awards. At the awards show, Teeks won the awards for Best Solo Artist, Best Soul/RnB Artist and Best Māori Artist.

Track listing

Credits and personnel

Devin Abrams – songwriter (12)
M Basa – piano (9), production support (9, 10), songwriter (6, 9–10)
Moana-Roa Callaghan – backing vocals (5)
Mahuia Bridgeman-Cooper – string arrangement (1, 3, 8, 11), songwriter (8, 11), violin (1, 3, 8, 11)
Mike Booth – flugelhorn (2–3), trumpet (2–3)
Tom Broome – drums (1, 3, 5, 8, 11–12), guitar (12)
Dan Diggas – songwriter (10)
Nick Dow – guitar (1), piano (4, 8, 10–11), songwriter (8, 10–11)
Josh Fountain – additional production (1, 3, 5, 9, 12), songwriting (1, 3)
John Gluyas – bass trombone (2–3), trombone (2–3)
Simon Gooding – bass (9), guitar (9), mixing engineer, producer
Anna Grahame – backing vocals (1, 3, 6, 8, 11–12)
Godfrey De Grut – horn arrangement (2–3)
Joe Harrop – viola (1, 3, 8, 11)
Stuart Hawkes – mastering
Jess Hindin – violin (1, 3, 8, 11)
Marika Hodgson – bass (6, 12)
Michael Howell – guitar (2, 5)
Bella Kalolo – backing vocals (3–4, 6, 12)
Abraham Kunin – guitar (1, 3, 6, 8, 12)
Peter Leupolu – keyboards (3, 5–6, 12)
Lewis McCallum – bass clarinet (2–3), flute (2–3), saxophone (2–3)
Cass Mitchell – bass (1–3, 5, 8)
Majic Paora – backing vocals (1, 3–4, 6, 8, 11–12)
Eric Scholes – double bass (1, 3, 8, 11)
Esther Stephens – backing vocals (3, 6, 12)
Adam Tobeck – drums (6)
Te Karehana Toi – guitar (7), producer, songwriter (1–13), vocals
Hope Tuisaua – songwriting (5)
Rachel Wells – cello (1, 3, 8, 11)

Charts

Weekly charts

Year-end charts

Certifications

Release history

References

2021 debut albums
Pop albums by New Zealand artists
Soul albums by New Zealand artists